Sterns may refer to:
Sterns (surname)
Stern's, defunct U.S. department store chain
Sterns Nightclub, defunct nightclub in Worthing, West Sussex, England
Stern's Pickle Works, defunct pickle factory based in New York
The Sterns, American band

See also
Stearns (disambiguation)
Stern (disambiguation)